"Utushka lugovaya" (A Little Meadow Duck) is an ancient Russian folk song.

Synopsis 
A young woman or maiden, also called utushka lugovaya, spends a night in the wood (or in the meadow), near a willow. Several young men pass by and make several gudocheks – each makes one for himself. The maiden asks the gudocheks not to tinkle, not to wake her (however, in some versions, her father) up.

Commentary

Historical background 
According to Alexander Tereshchenko, ″Utushka lugovaya″ could be performed during traditional Russian marriage celebrations. Pavel Svinyin wrote that the Don Cossacks used the song in matchmaking.

Some researchers consider that image ("Utushka lugovaya"/ "Young duck") as a traditional image of the young woman or bride.

Genre characteristics 
A number of sources mention the song as a plyasovaya or a khorovodnaya. Alexander Potebnja regards it – for its time signature – as an example of the so-called summer or spring songs.

Settings and performance 
Before 1792, Vasily Pashkevich created for his third opera a theme based on the song. In the following two centuries, many composers (such as P. I. Tchaikovsky, Nikolai Rimsky-Korsakov, Anatoly Lyadov, Alexander Ivanov-Kramskoi) arranged "Utushka lugovaya".

The song appeared in the repertoires of Lidia Ruslanova, Lyudmila Zykina, Alexandra Strelchenko, and other famous Russian folk singers.

References

External links 
 
 

Russian folk songs
Lidia Ruslanova songs
Year of song unknown
Songwriter unknown